The 2014–15 NC State Wolfpack men's basketball team represented North Carolina State University during the 2014–15 NCAA Division I men's basketball season. The Wolfpack, led by fourth year head coach Mark Gottfried, played their home games at PNC Arena and were members of the Atlantic Coast Conference. They finished the season 22–14, 10–8 in ACC play to finish in a tie for sixth place. They advanced to the quarterfinals of the ACC tournament where they lost to Duke. They received an at-large bid to the NCAA tournament where they defeated LSU in the second round and Villanova in the third round to advance to the Sweet Sixteen where they lost to fellow ACC member Louisville.

Previous season
The Wolfpack finished the previous season with a record of 22–14, 9–9 in ACC play, to finish in a three-way tie for seventh place. They advanced to the semifinals of the ACC tournament where they lost to Duke. They received an at-large bid to the NCAA tournament where they defeated Xavier in the First Four before losing in the second round to Saint Louis.

Off season

Departures

Class of 2014 signees

Roster

}

Schedule and results

|-
!colspan=12 style="background:#E00000; color:white;"| Exhibition

|-
!colspan=12 style="background:#E00000; color:white;"| Regular season

|-
!colspan=12 style="background:#E00000; color:white;"| ACC Tournament

|-
!colspan=12 style="background:#E00000; color:white;"| NCAA tournament

References

NC State Wolfpack men's basketball seasons
NC State
NC State
2014 in sports in North Carolina
2015 in sports in North Carolina